Chandapur is a village in Nayagarh district  in the state of Odisha, India. Chandpur one of the business centre of Ranpur block.

Demographics
 India census, Chandapur had a population of 5260. Males constitute 51% of the population and females 49%. Chandapur has an average literacy rate of 70%, higher than the national average of 59.5%; with male literacy of 76% and female literacy of 63%. 10% of the population is under 6 years of age.

References

Cities and towns in Nayagarh district